"Ain't No California" is a song written by Sterling Whipple, and recorded by American country music artist Mel Tillis.  It was released in August 1978 as the second single from the album I Believe in You. The song reached #4 on the Billboard Hot Country Singles & Tracks chart.

Chart performance

References

External links
 Lyrics of this song

1978 singles
Mel Tillis songs
Song recordings produced by Jimmy Bowen
MCA Records singles
1978 songs
Songs written by Sterling Whipple